Irreligion in Mozambique is not uncommon among Mozambicans largely in part due to past government suppression of religion. Though Christianity predominates, according to 2007 census results 19% of the country do not identify with a religion, down from 23.1% in 1997.

See also
 Religion in Mozambique
 Islam in Mozambique
 Demographics of Mozambique

References

Religion in Mozambique
Mozambique
Mozambique